V The Serial is an Indian soap opera which premiered from 26 November 2012 to 7 March 2013 on the TV channel Channel V India. A unique and interesting yet much popular and better presented, the show explores the life of the television actors through the eyes of a 17-year-old Rohan Shah. It includes all the actors in their real life roles. The show is jointly produced by Balaji Telefilms and Lost Boy Productions.

Summary 
The show is about an aspiring 17-year-old actor Rohan Shah whose role model is Karan Kundra. He goes to the Balaji office for an audition of Gumrah and gets selected. In the meantime he gets to go in Kundra's party (organised by Soumya Seth to reunite Kundra and Kittoo) with a friend and not knowing about Kundar's and Kittoo's (Kritika Kamra) breakup plays a cd having their past memories to wish them anniversary which angers Kundra. In the same party Sara Khan turns out naked to grab media attention and plays a large part in helping Rohan play that cd. The next day Sara is shocked to see the newspapers filled with the breakup news rather than her bikini pics. The story then covers the life and struggles of various celebrities from Rohan's point of view.

Cast

References

External links
  on Channel V India

Balaji Telefilms television series
Channel V India original programming
2012 Indian television series debuts
2013 Indian television series endings
Television series about television
Indian drama television series
Television shows set in Mumbai